Herbert Harry "Jim" Handby OBE (1 September 1903 – 2 October 1991) was an Australian rules footballer who played in the South Australian National Football League (SANFL) in the 1920s and 1930s, achieving several honours in recognition of his playing skills. He was later a federal Liberal politician and businessman.

Born Herbert Harry Handby in Adelaide, South Australia, Handby was invariably referred to simply as 'Jim'. Handby enjoyed a league football career at two SANFL clubs, achieving his greatest honours while featuring prominently in the development of the young Glenelg club.

Handby commenced his career with South Adelaide in 1922.  Although not a classically brilliant player, he displayed great perseverance and all round effectiveness.  He was quickly recognised as one of the best defenders in South Australia, and in 1923 Handby made his debut at state-level football.  Altogether he represented South Australia 29 times during his career.

Handby joined Glenelg in 1925, and on debut featured prominently in the club's first ever win (breaking a 56-game losing streak).  Handby won Glenelg's club champion award in 1925 and 1929.   He won the SANFL's Magarey Medal in 1928 as the fairest and most brilliant player in the competition.

He was Glenelg's captain-coach in 1926 and 1927 but then relinquished this role until 1930, when he started a further three-year period as captain-coach.  The best result he achieved as a coach was 6th (in an 8 team competition) in 1931.

After leaving football he became a publican and company director before being elected to Glenelg Council, and he served in the military from 1942 to 1945. In 1949, he was elected to the Australian House of Representatives as the Liberal member for the new seat of Kingston, defeating Labor member for Boothby Thomas Sheehy for the notionally Labor seat. He was defeated in 1951 by Labor's Pat Galvin and returned to his business career. He died in 1991.

See also
 1927 Melbourne Carnival

Footnotes

External links 
 SANFL Hall of Fame
 

1903 births
1991 deaths
Australian rules footballers from South Australia
South Adelaide Football Club players
Glenelg Football Club players
Glenelg Football Club coaches
Magarey Medal winners
South Australian Football Hall of Fame inductees
Australian sportsperson-politicians
Liberal Party of Australia members of the Parliament of Australia
Members of the Australian House of Representatives for Kingston
Members of the Australian House of Representatives
Officers of the Order of the British Empire
20th-century Australian politicians